St. Matthew's Church is a historic Episcopal church in Champlain, Virginia, United States. It was built between 1860 and 1865, and is a one-story, one bay, gable-end-entry, rectangular brick building.  It was consecrated in 1870 and served the residents for 100 years, until its conversion to a general store in 1970.

It was listed on the National Register of Historic Places in 2004.

References

19th-century Episcopal church buildings
Buildings and structures in Essex County, Virginia
Churches completed in 1865
Episcopal churches in Virginia
National Register of Historic Places in Essex County, Virginia
Churches on the National Register of Historic Places in Virginia